Tyulyabayevo (Tüläbay) is a rural locality (a village) in Volostnovsky Selsoviet, Kugarchinsky District, Bashkortostan, Russia. The population was 176 as of 2010. There are 3 streets.

Geography 
Tyulyabayevo is located 32 km northwest of Mrakovo (the district's administrative centre) by road. Kaldarovo is the nearest rural locality.

References 

Rural localities in Kugarchinsky District